MTV Hustle is India's first ever rap/hip-hop reality show. Aspiring rappers battle it out to become India’s biggest hip-hop star. The show airs on MTV India and also digitally streams on Voot.

Season 1 premiered on 10 August 2019. Judged by Raftaar, Nucleya and Raja Kumari and hosted by Gaelyn Mendonca.

Season 2 premiered on 3 September 2022. Hosted by Krissann Barretto, the show is judged by Badshah along with four squad bosses- which were EPR, Dino James, Dee MC, King Rocco.

Format
In Season 1, 40 auditionees were selected from the Voot online registrations, out of which only 15 rappers were selected to compete against each other. The rappers were judged on the basis on their writing, rapping flow and overall performance.

In Season 2, 16 contestants were chosen by Voot online auditions. Badshah decided which contestants to be assigned to and now the four Squad Bosses will groom and judge the contestants based on their talent, performance, meter, technique, musicality and storytelling. 

Viewers will also get a chance to be a part of the journey to root for their favourite performer through public voting on Voot.

Series

Season 1 
MTV Hustle 1 premiered on 10 August 2019 on MTV India.

• JudgesRaftaarNucleyaRaja Kumari

• HostGaelyn Mendonca.

Contestants

 Male
 Female

Summary

Notes

Weekly Summary

Week 3 (Episode 5–6)

Week 4 (Episode 7–8)

Week 5 (Episode 9–10)

Week 6 (Episode 11–12)

Week 7 (Episode 13–14)

Week 8 (Episode 15–16)

Week 9 (Episode 17–18) 

Special Performance by the first two finalists EPR & M-Zee-Bella along with Raftaar & Brodha V in Episode 18.

Week 10 (Episode 19–20) 

After Top 5 Finalists performed, Judges had to decide two of them to the Final Battle Round for the Title.

Guests

Season 2

Judges & Host 
Badshah along with four squad bosses EPR, King, Dino James and Dee MC judged and Krissann Barretto hosted the show.

Contestants

 Male
 Female

Squads

Episode 1-4

Episode 5-20

Squad of the Week

Summary

Notes
"Bold Numbers" represent "Radio Hits" received from Badshah
 Best Performer of the week
 Received positive critics and was declared safe
 Safe
 Received negative critics and was in Danger Zone but was declared safe 
 Bottom
 Eliminated
 Finalist
 Runner-up
 Winner
 Guest

Weekly Summary

Week 1-2 (Episode 1–4)
For week 1 & 2, after each contestant performed Badshah decides which squad to be assigned to. But, the Squad Bosses can sound the horn and ask the contestant to join their squad.

Battleground 2.0 
The bottom 6 contestant compete one vs one in the Battleground. Only 2 moved-on to the next round.

After 3 battles, the two squads EPR Rebels & King Slayers had to choose one contestant to join their squad. UNB was not chosen and was eliminated.

Snatch Battle 
In this battle the squad bosses compete against each other for a contestant.

Week 3 (Episode 5–6) 
From this week, the squad bosses scored after each performance.

Also the public voting were open, with the votes effecting the next week's elimination.

Week 4 (Episode 7–8) 
Last week's squad of the week, Dee MC had to choose one of the two random cards (Immunity Card: to save one Rapper from elimination & Danger Card: to put one Rapper up for elimination from other squad). She got the Danger Zone and chose Lxsh.

Week 5 (Episode 9–10) 
Last week's squad of the week, EPR had to choose one of the two random envelops (Power to eliminate & Power to save). He got Power to save and chose GD 47.

Week 6 (Episode 11–12) 
Theme: Lyrical

Last week's squad of the week, EPR had a special power "Judge 2.0", to judge the elimination battles. But he decided not to eliminate anyone.

Week 7 (Episode 13–14) 
Theme: Shout-out

Last week's squad of the week, Dino James had a special power "Score + 2.0", where he could add 2 points to any rapper. He choose GD 47 to add 2 points.

Week 8 (Episode 15-16) 

Theme #1: Collaboration - Squad Bosses' paired-up the rappers.

Theme #2: Badshah's Industry Ready Challenges:
 Dee MC Dynamites: Ad Jingle to Hip Hop (Classic range)
 Dino Warriors: Use Key Words in Rap (Muscle, Freak, Fitness, Weightlifting)
 EPR Rebels: Brand Anthem Rendition (Yamaha - the call of the blue)
 King Slayers: Bollywood to Hip Hop (Tujhko jo paya)

Last week's squad of the week, Dino James had a special power "Danger Zone 2.0", where he could another Collab pair in Danger Zone. He choose Spectra and Panther.

Week 9 Semi Final (Episode 17-18) 

Theme: Battleground 2.0

Top 10 contestants competed in one-on-one Battles to earn the Ticket to Finale. Only 5 contestants advanced to the Finale.

Top 5 Finalists performed for the public and the public voting were open for final time, with the votes deciding the winner next week.

Week 10 Final (Episode 19-20) 

After Top 5 Finalists performed, based on Public Votes three moved-on to TOP 3.

Guests

References

External links
 MTV Hustle on Voot

MTV (Indian TV channel) original programming
2019 Indian television series debuts
Indian reality television series
Indian music television series
Hip hop television